Os Magriços was the nickname of the Portugal national football team which finished third at the 1966 FIFA World Cup in England. The team were based on the Benfica team that won two consecutive European Cups in 1961 and 1962, which included Mário Coluna, Eusébio, José Augusto, José Augusto Torres and António Simões. They were selected by Manuel da Luz Afonso and coached by Otto Glória. The nickname is derived from a 15th-century Portuguese chivalric legend - The Twelve of England (Portuguese: Os Doze de Inglaterra). It was made famous by the poet Luís de Camões in his 1572 Os Lusíadas. It tells the story of twelve Portuguese knights who travelled to England at the request of twelve English women to avenge their insult by a group of English knights. One of these Portuguese knights, Álvaro Gonçalves Coutinho, was nicknamed O Magriço.

Team
Head coach:  Otto Glória

References

Nicknamed groups of association football players
Portugal at the 1966 FIFA World Cup
1960–61 in Portuguese football
1961–62 in Portuguese football
1962–63 in Portuguese football
1963–64 in Portuguese football
1964–65 in Portuguese football